The First National Bank Building, now known as the Central Place Apartments, is an historic building located in Fort Dodge, Iowa, United States. The First National Bank was established in 1866 and grew to become the city's principal financial institution.  Its officers and directors throughout its existence were among the city's most prominent businessmen.  The present building was designed by the Des Moines architectural firm of Liebbe, Nourse & Rasmussen in the Early Commercial style.   The six-story structure rises to a height of  The building has subsequently been renovated into apartments.   It was individually listed on the National Register of Historic Places in 2003, and as a contributing property in the Fort Dodge Downtown Historic District in 2010.

References

Commercial buildings completed in 1908
Fort Dodge, Iowa
Buildings and structures in Webster County, Iowa
Bank buildings on the National Register of Historic Places in Iowa
Chicago school architecture in Iowa
Apartment buildings in Iowa
National Register of Historic Places in Webster County, Iowa
Individually listed contributing properties to historic districts on the National Register in Iowa
1908 establishments in Iowa